Variciscala is a genus of small sea snails, marine gastropod molluscs in the family Epitoniidae, commonly known as wentletraps.

Species
Species within the genus Variciscala include:
 Variciscala raricostata (G. B. Sowerby II, 1844)
Species brought into synonymy
 Variciscala kelea (Iredale, 1930): synonym of Variciscala raricostata (G. B. Sowerby II, 1844)
 Variciscala martinii (W. Wood, 1828): synonym of Filiscala martinii (W. Wood, 1828), synonym of Filiscala raricosta (Lamarck, 1804)
 Variciscala reticulata (Lee & Wu, 1998): synonym of Epitonium reticulatum Lee & Wu, 1998

References

 Vaught, K.C. (1989). A classification of the living Mollusca. American Malacologists: Melbourne, FL (USA). . XII, 195 pp

Epitoniidae